Jim and Judy in Teleland is a 1949 American syndicated animated television series. It was one of the first cartoon series made for television, and was featured regularly as a part of children's shows on local television. The series was later shown in 1959 under the title Bob and Betty in Adventureland.

Premise 

In the show, Jim and Judy, two all-American kids, climbed into their TV set to have adventures in Teleland. The show used "a melange of cutout animation (jogging cardboard figures past the screen to create the illusion of movement) and limited cel art."

History 
Peroff created 52 episodes of the series in 1949-50 but had a difficult time finding distribution for his product. The show was later sold to Venezuela in 1954, to Deadwood, South Dakota in 1954 and to Japan in 1956. In the cartoon Jim and Judy used to enter their television for adventures.

References

External links
 
 

1949 American television series debuts
1950 American television series endings
1940s American animated television series
1950s American animated television series
American children's animated adventure television series
Animated television series about children
First-run syndicated television programs in the United States
Television series about television
American stop-motion animated television series